Jungle Jim is a 1955–56 American TV series based on the Jungle Jim newspaper comic strip. It stars Johnny Weissmuller, who had previously played the character in a series of sixteen theatrically released Jungle Jim feature films, which were produced soon after he retired from the Tarzan film series in 1948 for which he is best remembered. 

The "Jungle Jim" TV show premiered on Sept. 26, 1955 and ended its 26 episode run on March 19, 1956. It ran for 26 episodes and was produced by Screen Gems who sold it into syndication. (See also Jungle Jim).

Cast
Johnny Weissmuller as Jungle Jim
Martin Huston as Skipper
Dean Fredericks as Kaseem
Tamba as Tamba the Chimp
Paul Cavanagh as Commissioner Morrison (in 8 episodes)

Episode Titles

1.  Man Killer (broadcast Sept. 26, 1955)
2.  Land of Terror
3.  Treasure of the Amazon
4.  Lagoon of Death
5.  A Fortune in Ivory
6.  Jungle Justice
7.  The Eyes of Minobo
8.  The King's Ghost
9.  White Magic (starring Bernie Hamilton)
10. The Deadly Idol
11. The Leopard's Paw (starred Woody Strode)
12. The Man From Zanzibar
13. Precious Cargo

14. The Golden Parosol
15. Code of the Jungle
16. Wild Man of the Jungle (starred John Banner)
17. Safari Into Danger
18. Blood Money
19. Striped Fury
20. Scared Scarab
21. Voodoo Drums (starred I. Stanford Jolley)
22. The Avenger
23. Return of the Tuaregs (with Mel Welles, Byron Foulger)
24. The Silver Locket
25. Gift of Evil
26. The Power of Darkness (starred Keye Luke)

References

External links

Jungle Jim main article
Jungle Jim (serial)
Jungle Jim (film) Titles of feature films
Bomba the Jungle Boy
Ramar of the Jungle
Congo Bill

1955 American television series debuts
1956 American television series endings
Black-and-white American television shows
First-run syndicated television programs in the United States
Television shows based on comic strips
Television series by Screen Gems